is a Japanese actor associated with Avance.

Filmography

Films

Theatre

Television

References

External links
  

21st-century Japanese male actors
Japanese male musical theatre actors
Japanese male stage actors
Japanese male voice actors
Living people
1987 births